Alemannia (minor planet designation: 418 Alemannia), provisional designation , is a metallic background asteroid from the central region of the asteroid belt, approximately 35 kilometers in diameter. It was discovered by German astronomer Max Wolf at Heidelberg Observatory in southern Germany on 7 September 1896 and named for the student fraternity Alemannia in Heidelberg.

Orbit and classification 

Alemannia is a non-family asteroid from the main belt's background population. It orbits the Sun in the intermediate main-belt at a distance of 2.3–2.9 AU once every 4 years and 2 months (1,525 days; semi-major axis of 2.59 AU). Its orbit has an eccentricity of 0.12 and an inclination of 7° with respect to the ecliptic. The body's observation arc begins at Heidelberg in December 1905, more than 9 years after its official discovery observation.

Physical characteristics 

In the Tholen classification, Alemannia is a metallic M-type asteroid. The Wide-field Infrared Survey Explorer (WISE) also characterized it as an M-type.

Rotation period 

The best-rated photometric lightcurve observations gave a rotation period of 4.671 hours with a brightness amplitude between 0.20 and 0.33 magnitude, superseding previous observations that gave a period of 5.82 and 4.68 hours, respectively.

Diameter and albedo 

According to the surveys carried out by the Infrared Astronomical Satellite IRAS, the Japanese Akari satellite and the NEOWISE mission of NASA's WISE telescope, Alemannia measures between 32.98 and 45.448 kilometers in diameter and its surface has an albedo between 0.1057 and 0.201.

The Collaborative Asteroid Lightcurve Link adopts the results obtained by IRAS, that is, an albedo of 0.1878 and a diameter of 34.1 kilometers based on an absolute magnitude of 9.77.

Naming 

This minor planet was named for the student fraternity Alemannia in Heidelberg, Germany. It was named by German astronomer Adolf Berberich (1861–1920) in 1901. The official naming citation was mentioned in The Names of the Minor Planets by Paul Herget in 1955.

References

External links 
 Asteroid Lightcurve Database (LCDB), query form (info )
 Dictionary of Minor Planet Names, Google books
 Asteroids and comets rotation curves, CdR – Observatoire de Genève, Raoul Behrend
 Discovery Circumstances: Numbered Minor Planets (1)-(5000) – Minor Planet Center
 
 

000418
Discoveries by Max Wolf
Named minor planets
000418
18960907